John Higgins (15 October 1932 – 22 April 2005) was an English professional footballer who played mainly in central defence. Born in Bakewell, Higgins was brought up in Buxton, Derbyshire, and began his football career with local club Buxton. He later played for Bolton Wanderers in the Football League between 1952 and 1961. He played in Bolton's 2–0 win over Manchester United in the 1958 FA Cup Final. In 1961, he joined Wigan Athletic, and went on to play 77 Cheshire League games in two seasons at the club. He then spent two seasons with fellow Cheshire League club Altrincham.

References

External links 
 
 John Higgins, Neil Brown
 Bolton Revisited article
 Buxton Advertiser article

1932 births
2005 deaths
People from Bakewell
Footballers from Derbyshire
English footballers
Association football central defenders
Buxton F.C. players
Bolton Wanderers F.C. players
Wigan Athletic F.C. players
Altrincham F.C. players
English Football League players
FA Cup Final players